The 2017–18 Cayman Islands Premier League season is the 39th season of top-tier football in the Cayman Islands. It began on 14 October 2017 and ended on 8 April 2018.

Standings

References 

Cayman Islands Premier League seasons
Cayman Islands
Prem